Western white pine (Pinus monticola), also called silver pine and California mountain pine, is a species of pine in the family Pinaceae. It occurs in mountain ranges of northwestern North America and is the state tree of Idaho.

Description 
It is a member of the white pine group, Pinus subgenus Strobus, and like all members of that group, the leaves ('needles') are in fascicles (bundles) of five, with a deciduous sheath.

The branches are borne in regular whorls, produced at the rate of one a year; this is pronounced in narrow, stand-grown trees, while open specimens may have a more rounded form with wide-reaching limbs. When mature, the tree has bark that appears to be cut into small, checkered units.

Similar species 
It is related to the Eastern white pine (Pinus strobus), differing from it in having larger cones, slightly longer-lasting leaves (2–3 years, rather than 1.5–2 years) with more prominent stomatal bands, and a somewhat denser and narrower habit.

Distribution 
The species occurs in humid areas of the mountains of the Western United States and Western Canada such as the Sierra Nevada, the Cascade Range, the Coast Range, and the northern Rocky Mountains. The tree often occurs in forests with fir and hemlock species, especially those which are tolerant of shade. It benefits from disturbances that clear away competing species, including low fires that do not destroy all of its cone-protected seeds. It is also well adapted to poor, rocky soils.

Ecology 
Once abundant in northern Idaho, Western white pine's population was drastically affected from the late 19th century to the late 20th century by logging, wildfires, white pine blister rust, and a bark beetle epidemic. Since 1970, millions of Western white pine seedlings have been planted to make up for the losses.

The white pine blister rust (Cronartium ribicola) is a fungus that was accidentally introduced from Europe in 1909. The United States Forest Service estimates that 90% of the Western white pines have been killed by the blister rust west of the Cascades. Large stands have been succeeded by other pines or non-pine species. The rust has also killed much of the whitebark pine outside of California. Blister rust is less severe in California, and Western white and whitebark pines have survived there in great numbers.

Resistance to the blister rust is genetic; due to Western white pine's genetic variability, some individuals are relatively unaffected. The Forest Service has a program for locating and breeding rust-resistant Western white pine and sugar pine. Seedlings of these trees have been introduced into the wild.

Uses 
The gum was reportedly chewed by Native Americans to treat coughs. The pitch was used to fasten arrowheads and coat fishing and whaling instruments. European colonists used both Western and Eastern white pine as softwood lumber. Both species are considered excellent for molding and carving. First the Eastern and then the Western species were used in the building of transcontinental railroads in the late 19th century. In the early 20th century, white pine was used to build houses and make matches.

Western white pine is widely grown as an ornamental tree.

References

Further reading

External links

 
  Jepson Manual treatment – Pinus monticola
 

Pinus
Pinus taxa by common names
Trees of the Northwestern United States
Trees of the Southwestern United States
Trees of Alberta
Trees of British Columbia
Flora of the Sierra Nevada (United States)
Symbols of Idaho